Amhlaeibh Mac Innaighneorach, Chief Harper of Ireland, died 1168.

Mac Innaighneorach is one of the earliest recorded Irish professional musicians. The Annals of the Four Masters call him the chief ollamh of Ireland in harp-playing but provide no other details of his life.

The existence of his obituary is thought to denote his profession's newly acquired respectability, as there are very few direct references to professional musicians in Ireland prior to his lifetime. Nevertheless, musicians would never hold the same esteem as poets, lawyers and historians in Gaelic culture.

See also

 Clàrsach
 Ferdomhnach Dall, d. 1110
 Aed mac Donn Ó Sochlachain, d. 1224.
 Maol Ruanaidh Cam Ó Cearbhaill, murdered 1329.

References
 Ann Buckley: "Musical Instruments in Ireland 9th–14th Centuries: A Review of the Organological Evidence", in: Musicology in Ireland (= Irish Musical Studies vol. 1), ed. G. Gillen & H. White (Blackrock, Co. Dublin: Irish Academic Press, 1990), pp. 13–57.
 Ann Buckley: "Music and Musicians in Medieval Irish Society", in: Early Music 28 (2000) 2, pp. 165–190.
 Ann Buckley: "Music in Prehistoric and Medieval Ireland", in: A New History of Ireland vol. 1, ed. Dáibhí Ó Cróinín (Oxford: Oxford University Press, 2005), pp. 744–813.

External links
 http://www.ucc.ie/celt/published/T100005B/index.html

1168 deaths
12th-century Irish people
Medieval Irish musicians
Irish harpists
Medieval Gaels from Ireland
Year of birth unknown